Choroidal artery can refer to:
 Anterior choroidal artery (arteria chorioidea anterior)
 Posterior choroidal artery, branches from the posterior cerebral artery (arteria cerebri posterior)